Something About You may refer to:
 Something About You (Angela Bofill album), 1981
 Something About You (Joey Yung album), 2002
 "Something About You" (Four Tops song). 1965
 "Something About You" (Level 42 song), 1985
 "Something About You" (New Edition song), 1996
 "Something About You" (Jamelia song), 2006
 "Something About You" (Christian Burns song), 2008
 "Something About You" (Hayden James song), 2014
 "Something About You" (Elderbrook and Rudimental song), 2019
 "Something About You" (Eyedress song), 2021
 "Something About You," a song by Boston from Boston
 "Something About You:" a song by Five for Fighting from the album America Town
 "Something About You", a song by Majid Jordan from the album Majid Jordan
 "Something About You", a song by Re-Flex from the album The Politics of Dancing

See also 
 "Sum Bout U", 2020 single by 645AR featuring FKA Twigs